The Lyapiske (Leepiske), also known as Lepiske or Lyampushka, is a river in the Kobyaysky District of the Sakha Republic (Yakutia), Russia. There are no settlements in the area of the river.

Taimen is an abundant species in the river, a fact being mentioned in the Red Data Book of the Russian Federation. Lenok, pike, grayling, ide, perch and whitefish are also found in the waters of the Lyapiske.  In the International scale of river difficulty the Lyapiske is a Class II destination for rafting and kayaking.

Course
The Lyapiske is a right tributary of the Lena. It flows across mountainous terrain all along its course. No trees grow on the slopes of the mountain range, only in the valleys. The Lyapiske flows northwestwards, flanking the northeastern side of the Tagindzhin Range in its upper course. Then, before the end of the range it bends southwestwards into a gorge, cutting across the Tagindzhin, the Muosuchan and the Bygyn ranges, after which it bends and flows southwards. 
A little upstream from its confluence with the Buruolakh, its main tributary, the Lyapiske bends sharply again and flows roughly westwards, cutting across the Kuturgin Range. 

In its last stretch the Lyapiske flows at the northwestern limit of the Ust-Vilyuy Range where it makes two short sharp bends among high rocky shores. Finally it flows across a stretch of flat terrain at the edge of the Central Yakutian Lowland and joins the right bank of the Lena  from its mouth. Its confluence with the Lena is close to the mouth of the Tympylykan on the opposite bank.

Other significant tributaries are Igelte, Tolbon, Muosuchan and Sygynkan.

See also
List of rivers of Russia

References

External links 
 Geography - Yakutia Organized

Rivers of the Sakha Republic
Verkhoyansk Range
Central Yakutian Lowland